Swedesburg is an unincorporated community and census-designated place (CDP) in northern Henry County, Iowa, United States. It was first listed as a CDP prior to the 2020 census.

Demographics

Location
Swedesburg is in north central Henry County just west of US Route 218 nine miles north of Mount Pleasant.

Although Swedesburg is unincorporated, it has a post office with the ZIP code of 52652.

History
Swedesburg was originally built up chiefly by Swedish immigrants. They first arrived in the region in the 1860s after a wave of migration to the nearby Jefferson County in the 1840s.

Swedesburg had a population of 86 in 2000.

Attractions and landmarks
Swedesburg has a museum, the Swedish American Museum, which commemorates the community's Swedish heritage. It is housed in the former Farmers Union Exchange Building, a structure which dates from the 1920s.

The following buildings are on the National Register of Historic Places:
 Swedish Evangelical Lutheran Church
 John Hultquist House
 Charles E. Hult House, Summer Kitchen and Wood Shed
 Red Ball Garage

Education
The Mount Pleasant Community School District operates local area public schools.

Literature
The author Bill Bryson mentions Swedesburg in his 2006 memoir, The Life and Times of the Thunderbolt Kid. Bryson recalls seeing Swedesburg from a distance whilst visiting his grandparents in nearby Winfield in the 1950s, and reflects how the heritages of settlements such as Swedesburg were affected by the policies of Governor William L. Harding, which resulted in the decline of European languages in the state.

References

 
Census-designated places in Henry County, Iowa
Census-designated places in Iowa
Unincorporated communities in Henry County, Iowa
Unincorporated communities in Iowa
Swedish-American culture in Iowa
1860s establishments in Iowa